The 1992 Summer Olympics, officially known as the Games of the XXV Olympiad and commonly known as Barcelona '92, were an international multi-sport event held from 25 July to 9 August 1992 in Barcelona, Catalonia, Spain. This was the second (after 1968) "Olympic Games" to be held in a Spanish-speaking nation, then followed by the 2018 Summer Youth Olympics in Buenos Aires, Argentina. Beginning in 1994, the International Olympic Committee decided to hold the Summer and Winter Olympics in alternating even-numbered years. The 1992 Summer and Winter Olympics were the last games to be staged in the same year. This games was the second and last two consecutive Olympic games to be held in Western Europe after the 1992 Winter Olympics in Albertville, France held five months earlier.

The 1992 Summer Games were the first since the end of the Cold War, and the first unaffected by boycotts since the 1972 Summer Games. 1992 was also the first year South Africa was re-invited to the Olympic Games by the International Olympic Committee, after a 32-year ban from participating in international sport. The Unified Team (made up by the former Soviet republics without the Baltic states) topped the medal table, winning 45 gold and 112 overall medals.

Host city selection 
Barcelona is the second-largest city in Spain and the capital of the autonomous community of Catalonia, and the hometown of then-IOC president Juan Antonio Samaranch and the famous European club, FC Barcelona. The city was also a host for the 1982 FIFA World Cup. On 17 October 1986, Barcelona was selected to host the 1992 Summer Olympics over Amsterdam, Netherlands; Belgrade, Yugoslavia; Birmingham, United Kingdom; Brisbane, Australia; and Paris, France, during the 91st IOC Session in Lausanne, Switzerland.  With 85 out of 89 members of the IOC voting by secret ballot, Barcelona won a majority of 47 votes.  Samaranch abstained from voting.  In the same IOC meeting, Albertville, France, won the right to host the 1992 Winter Games. Paris and Brisbane would eventually be selected to host the 2024 and 2032 Summer Olympics respectively.

Barcelona had previously bid for the 1936 Summer Olympics that were ultimately held in Berlin.

Highlights 

 At the innovative opening ceremony, Greek mezzo-soprano Agnes Baltsa sang "Romiossini" as the Olympic flag was paraded around the stadium. Alfredo Kraus later sang the Olympic Hymn in Catalan, Spanish and French, as the flag was hoisted.
 The Olympic cauldron was ignited using a flaming arrow, lit from the flame of the Olympic torch. It was shot by Paralympic archer Antonio Rebollo, who aimed the arrow over the top of the cauldron to ignite the gas emanating from it. The arrow landed outside the stadium. This unusual method for lighting the cauldron had been carefully designed to avoid any chance of the arrow landing in the stadium if Rebollo missed his target.
 South Africa rejoined the Summer Olympics having been banned for its apartheid policy after the 1960 Summer Olympics. The Women's 10,000 metres event was hotly contested. White South African runner Elana Meyer and black Ethiopian runner Derartu Tulu (winner) ran hand-in-hand in a victory lap.
 Germany sent a unified team having reunified in 1990, the last such team was at the 1964 Summer Olympics.
 As the Soviet Union was dissolved in 1991, the formerly Soviet-occupied states of Estonia and Latvia sent their own teams for the first time since 1936, while Lithuania sent its own team for the first time since 1928. The other former Soviet republics decided to compete together and formed the Unified Team, which consisted of present-day Armenia, Azerbaijan, Belarus, Georgia, Kazakhstan, Kyrgyzstan, Moldova, Russia, Tajikistan, Turkmenistan, Ukraine, and Uzbekistan. The Unified Team finished first in the medal standings, edging the United States.
 The separation of the Socialist Federal Republic of Yugoslavia led to the Olympic debuts of Croatia, Slovenia and Bosnia and Herzegovina. Due to United Nations sanctions, athletes from the Federal Republic of Yugoslavia (consisting of present-day Serbia and Montenegro) were not allowed to participate with their own team. However, some individual athletes competed under the Olympic flag as Independent Olympic Participants. Serbia would return to the Olympics at the 2008 Summer Olympics and as well as Montenegro on would be its Olympic debut as separate states.
 In basketball, the admittance of NBA players led to the formation of the "Dream Team" of the United States, featuring Michael Jordan, Magic Johnson, Larry Bird and other NBA stars. Prior to 1992, only European and South American professionals were allowed to compete, while the Americans used college players. The Dream Team won the gold medal and was inducted as a unit into the Basketball Hall of Fame in 2010.
 Fermín Cacho won the 1,500 m in his home country, earning Spain's first-ever Olympic gold medal in a running event.
 Chinese diver Fu Mingxia, age 13, became one of the youngest Olympic gold medalists of all time.
 In men's artistic gymnastics, Vitaly Scherbo from Belarus, (representing the Unified Team), won six gold medals, including four in a single day. Scherbo tied Eric Heiden's record for individual gold medals at a single Olympics, winning five medals in an individual event (Michael Phelps would later equal this record in 2008).
 In women's artistic gymnastics, Tatiana Gutsu took gold in the All-Around competition edging the USA's Shannon Miller.
 Russian swimmers (competing for the Unified Team) dominated the men's freestyle events, with Alexander Popov and Yevgeny Sadovyi each winning two events. Sadovyi also won in the relays.
 Evelyn Ashford won her fourth Olympic gold medal in the 4×100-metre relay, making her one of only four female athletes to have achieved this in history.
 The young Krisztina Egerszegi of Hungary won three individual swimming gold medals.
 In women's 200 m breaststroke, Kyoko Iwasaki of Japan won a gold medal at the age of 14 years and six days, making her the youngest-ever gold medalist in swimming competitions at the Olympics.
 Algerian athlete Hassiba Boulmerka, who was frequently criticized by Muslim groups in Algeria who thought she showed too much of her body when racing, received death threats and was forced to move to Europe to train, won the 1,500 metres, also holding the African women's record in this distance.
 After being demonstrated in six previous Summer Olympic Games, baseball officially became an Olympic sport. Badminton and women's judo also became part of the Olympic program, while slalom canoeing returned to the Games after a 20-year absence.
 Roller hockey, Basque pelota, and taekwondo were all demonstrated at the 1992 Summer Olympics.
 Several of the USA men's volleyball gold medal team from the 1988 Olympics returned to vie for another medal. In the preliminary round, they lost a controversial match to Japan, sparking them to shave their heads in protest. This notably included player Steve Timmons, sacrificing his trademark red flattop for the protest. The U.S. team ultimately progressed to the playoffs and won bronze.
 Mike Stulce of the United States won the men's shot put, beating the heavily favored Werner Günthör of Switzerland.
 On the 20th anniversary of the Munich massacre and the 500th anniversary of the Alhambra Decree, Yael Arad became the first Israeli to win an Olympic medal, winning a silver medal in judo. The next day, Oren Smadja became Israel's first male medalist, winning a bronze in the same sport.
 Derek Redmond of Great Britain tore a hamstring during a 400-meter semi-final heat. As he struggled to finish the race, his father entered the track without credentials and helped him complete the race, to a standing ovation from the crowd.
 Gail Devers came into the 100 meters hurdles as the favorite. Though her Olympic history shows her winning the 100 meters dash twice, the first time earlier in this Olympics, she primarily made her career as a hurdler. And true to form, Devers had a commanding lead in this race until the final hurdle. Devers came up short and hit the hurdle, foot first, hard, knocking her off balance. She stumbled toward the finish line, falling on the last step, but still finished fifth, .001 out of fourth place. Paraskevi Patoulidou of Greece won the gold medal to even her own disbelief, dropping to her knees on the track when she realized she had won.
 Jennifer Capriati won the singles tennis competition at the age of 16. She had previously earned a spot in the semifinals of two grand slams at the age of 14.
 Two gold medals were awarded in solo synchronized swimming after a judge inadvertently entered the score of "8.7" instead of the intended "9.7" in the computerized scoring system for one of Sylvie Fréchette's figures. This error ultimately placed Fréchette second, leaving Kristen Babb-Sprague for the gold medal. Following an appeal, FINA awarded Fréchette a gold medal, replacing her silver medal and leaving the two swimmers both with gold.
 Indonesia won its first-ever gold medal after winning a silver medal at 1988 Olympics. Susi Susanti won the gold in badminton women's singles after defeating Bang Soo-hyun in the final round. Alan Budikusuma won the badminton men's singles competition, earning a second gold medal for Indonesia. Several years later, Susanti and Budikusuma married and she received the nickname golden bride or Olympic bride.

Records

Venues 

Montjuïc Area: 
Cross-country course – modern pentathlon (running)
Estadi Olímpic de Montjuïc – opening/closing ceremonies, athletics
Palau Sant Jordi – gymnastics (artistics), volleyball (final), and handball (final)
Piscines Bernat Picornell – modern pentathlon (swimming), swimming, synchronized swimming, and water polo (final)
Piscina Municipal de Montjuïc – diving and water polo
Institut National d'Educació Física de Catalunya – wrestling
Mataró – athletics (marathon start)
Palau dels Esports de Barcelona – gymnastics (rhythmic) and volleyball
Palau de la Metal·lúrgia – fencing, modern pentathlon (fencing)
Pavelló de l'Espanya Industrial – weightlifting
Walking course – athletics (walks)
Diagonal Area:
Camp Nou – football (final)
Palau Blaugrana – judo, roller hockey (demonstration final), and taekwondo (demonstration)
Estadi de Sarrià – football
Real Club de Polo de Barcelona – equestrian (dressage, jumping, eventing final), modern pentathlon (riding)
Vall d'Hebron Area:
Archery Field – archery
Pavelló de la Vall d'Hebron – Basque pelota (demonstration) and volleyball
Tennis de la Vall d'Hebron – tennis
Velodrome – cycling (track)
Parc de Mar Area
Estació del Nord Sports Hall – table tennis
Olympic Harbour – sailing
Pavelló de la Mar Bella – badminton
Subsites
A-17 highway – cycling (road team time trial)
Banyoles Lake – rowing
Camp Municipal de Beisbol de Viladecans – baseball
Canal Olímpic de Catalunya – canoeing (sprint)
Circuit de Catalunya – cycling (road team time trial start/ finish)
Club Hípic El Montayá – equestrian (dressage, eventing endurance)
Estadi de la Nova Creu Alta – football
Estadi Olímpic de Terrassa – field hockey
Estadio Luís Casanova – football
La Romareda – football
L'Hospitalet de Llobregat Baseball Stadium – baseball (final)
Mollet del Vallès Shooting Range – modern pentathlon (shooting), shooting
Palau D'Esports de Granollers – handball
Parc Olímpic del Segre – canoeing (slalom)
Pavelló Club Joventut Badalona – boxing
Pavelló de l'Ateneu de Sant Sadurní – roller hockey (demonstration)
Pavelló del Club Patí Vic – roller hockey (demonstration)
Pavelló d'Esports de Reus – roller hockey (demonstration)
Pavelló Olímpic de Badalona – basketball
Sant Sadurní Cycling Circuit – cycling (individual road race)
Some events, including diving, took place in view of construction of the Sagrada Família

Medals awarded 

The 1992 Summer Olympic programme featured 257 events in the following 25 sports:

Demonstration sports 

 Roller hockey (quad) (1)

Participating National Olympic Committees 

A total of 169 nations sent athletes to compete in the 1992 Summer Games.

With the dissolution of the Soviet Union, twelve of the fifteen new states chose to form a Unified Team, while the Baltic States of Estonia and Latvia sent their own teams for the first time since 1936, and Lithuania sent its own team for the first time since 1928. For the first time, Croatia, Slovenia and Bosnia-Herzegovina competed as independent nations after their separation from Socialist Yugoslavia, and Namibia and the unified team of Yemen (previously North and South Yemen) also made their Olympic debuts.

The 1992 Summer Olympics notably marked Germany competing as a unified team for the first time since 1964. South Africa returned to the Games for the first time in 32 years.

The Federal Republic of Yugoslavia was banned due to UN sanctions, but individual Yugoslav athletes were allowed to take part as Independent Olympic Participants. Four then-existing National Olympic Committees did not send any athletes to compete: Afghanistan, Brunei, Liberia and Somalia.

Number of athletes by National Olympic Committee 
9,356 athletes from 169 NOCs

<noinclude>

Calendar

Medal count 

The following table reflects the top ten nations in terms of total medals won at the 1992 Games (the host nation is highlighted).

Broadcasting

International signal
In order to guarantee that the international signal was produced objectively and impartially, for the first time in Olympic history, a host broadcaster was expressly created for each of the 1992 Olympic Games instead of delegating responsibility to a national host broadcaster. The Albertville Organizing Committee created the Organisme de radio télévision olympique '92 (ORTO'92) for the Winter Olympics and the Barcelona Organizing Committee created the Radio Televisión Olímpica '92 (RTO'92) for the Summer Olympics.

RTO'92 managed the staff and the production and technical resources hired to Radiotelevisión Española (RTVE), the Corporació Catalana de Ràdio i Televisió (CCRTV) and the European Broadcasting Union (EBU). With a workforce of 3,083 people, a permanent radio and television installation at the Olympic Stadium and Palau Sant Jordi, and over 50 mobile units for other venues, RTO'92 provided live coverage of all Summer Olympic sports for the first time ever –except for a few preliminary events–, some 2,800 hours of live television footage, to its international rights-holders. The International Broadcast Centre (IBC) was located at the exhibition halls of Fira de Barcelona in Montjuïc.

NHK and Panasonic developed the 1/2" DX digital system used to record the Games digitally for the first time.

Personalized coverage
To cover the Games, major international broadcasting unions such as the Asia-Pacific Broadcasting Union (ABU), the European Broadcasting Union (EBU), the International Radio and Television Organisation (OIRT), the Organización de Televisión Iberoamericana (OTI), the Arab States Broadcasting Union (ASBU), the Caribbean Broadcasting Union (CBU) and the Union of African National Television and Radio Organizations (URTNA), secured the rights for their member broadcasters in their countries. In other countries, broadcast networks secured the rights directly or pooled to secure the rights. The Games were covered by the following television and radio broadcasters:

HDTV coverage
The 1992 Winter and Summer Olympics were the first in which a comprehensive coverage in high-definition television (HDTV) was attempted. The European HDTV broadcast of the Summer Olympics was managed by the joint venture "Barcelona 1250" created by RTO'92, RTVE, Retevisión and PESA, with the financial support of the European Economic Community and a workforce of over 300 production and technical staff. A total of 225 hours and 45 minutes was broadcast in analog HD-MAC standard in 1,250 lines and 16:9 aspect ratio, with commentary in five languages –Spanish, English, French, German and Italian– in addition to the non-commentary sound track, of eighteen different sports at seventeen venues, as well as the opening and closing ceremonies. Events from five venues were covered live –80% of the total broadcast time– and other events were recorded for a delayed broadcast. On-screen text and graphics were shown in HDTV for the first time ever. Nearly 700 viewing sites installed throughout Europe, including the fifty HDTV receivers installed in various pavilions at the Seville Universal Exposition, were able to receive the broadcast.

For Japan, NHK also covered the 1992 Summer Olympics in HDTV in their own analog Hi-Vision system.

Terrorism
The Basque nationalist group ETA attempted to disrupt the Barcelona Games with terrorist attacks. It was already feared beforehand that ETA would use the Olympics to gain publicity for their cause in front of a worldwide audience. As the time of the Games approached, ETA committed attacks in Barcelona and the Catalonia region as a whole, including the deadly 1991 Vic bombing. On 10 July 1992, the group offered a two-month truce covering the Olympics in exchange for negotiations, which the Spanish government rejected. However, the Games went ahead successfully without an attack.

Effect on the city 

The celebration of the 1992 Olympic Games had an enormous impact on the urban culture and outward projection of Barcelona. The Games provided billions of dollars for infrastructure investments, which are considered to have improved the quality of life in the city, and its attraction for investment and tourism. Barcelona became one of the most visited cities in Europe after Paris, London, and Rome.

Barcelona's nomination for the 1992 Summer Olympics sparked the implementation of an ambitious plan for urban transformation that had already been developed previously. Barcelona was opened to the sea with the construction of the Olympic Village and Olympic Port in Poblenou. New centers were created, and modern sports facilities were built in the Olympic zones of Montjuïc, Diagonal, and Vall d'Hebron; hotels were also refurbished and new ones built. The construction of ring roads around the city helped to reduce traffic density, and El Prat airport was modernized and expanded with the opening of two new terminals.

Cost and cost overrun 
The Oxford Olympics Study estimates the direct costs of the Barcelona 1992 Summer Olympics to be US$9.7 billion (expressed in 2015 U.S. dollars) with a cost overrun of 266%. This includes only sports-related costs, that is: (i) operational costs incurred by the organizing committee for the purpose of staging the Games, e.g., expenditures for technology, direct transportation, workforce, administration, security, catering, ceremonies, and medical services; and (ii) direct capital costs incurred by the host city and country or private investors to build the competition venues, the Olympic village, international broadcast center, media and press center, and similar structures required to host the Games. Costs excluded from the study are indirect capital and infrastructure costs, such as for road, rail, or airport infrastructure, or for hotel upgrades or other business investment incurred in preparation for the Games.

The costs for Barcelona 1992 may be compared with those of London 2012, which cost US$15 billion with a cost overrun of 76%, and those of Rio 2016 which cost US$4.6 billion with a cost overrun of 51%. The average cost for the Summer Olympics since 1960 is US$5.2 billion, with an average cost overrun of 176%.

Songs and themes 
There were two main musical themes for the 1992 Games. The first one was "Barcelona", a classical crossover song composed five years earlier by Freddie Mercury and Mike Moran; Mercury was an admirer of lyric soprano Montserrat Caballé, both recorded the official theme as a duet. Due to Mercury's death eight months earlier, the duo was unable to perform the song together during the opening ceremony. A recording of the song instead played over a travelogue of the city at the start of the opening ceremony, seconds before the official countdown.  
"Amigos Para Siempre" (Friends for Life) was the other musical theme and it was official theme song of the 1992 Summer Olympics. It was written by Andrew Lloyd Webber and Don Black, and sung by Sarah Brightman and José Carreras during the closing ceremonies.

Ryuichi Sakamoto composed and conducted some musical pieces at the opening ceremony musical score. The Opening Olympic fanfare was composed by Angelo Badalamenti and with orchestrations by Joseph Turrin.

Mascot 

The official mascot was Cobi, a Catalan sheepdog in cubist style designed by Javier Mariscal.

Corporate image and identity 
A renewal in Barcelona's image and corporate identity could be seen in the publication of posters, commemorative coins, stamps minted by the FNMT in Madrid, and the Barcelona 1992 Olympic Official Commemorative Medals, designed and struck in Barcelona.

See also 

Olympics Triplecast
Use of performance-enhancing drugs at the 1992 Olympic Games
Barcelona Gold – compilation album released for the 1992 Games
Urban planning of Barcelona

References

External links 

Barcelona Olympic Foundation
Olympic Review 1992 - Official results 
Barcelona Olympic Stadium
Postage stamps of the Republic of Moldova, celebrating the Barcelona Summer Olympics in 1992
Postage stamps of the Republic of Moldova, celebrating medal winners at the Barcelona Summer Olympics in 1992

 
1992 in multi-sport events
1992 in Catalan sport
1992 in Spanish sport
1990s in Barcelona
International sports competitions hosted by Catalonia
Olympic Games in Spain
Sports competitions in Barcelona
1992
July 1992 sports events in Europe
August 1992 sports events in Europe
ABS-CBN television specials